Mason Consolidated Schools (sometimes referred to as Erie-Mason) is a public school district in Erie Township, Michigan.  The district includes all of Erie Township (including the city of Luna Pier) and a small portion of La Salle Township to the north.  Mason Consolidated Schools consists of three schools on one campus, located along M-125 and Lakeside Drive (formerly M-151).

Schools

Elementary schools
 Central Elementary School

Secondary schools
 Mason Middle School
 Mason Senior High School

Images

References

External links
 Mason Consolidated School

School districts in Michigan
Education in Monroe County, Michigan